Rick Bates (born 19 March 1965) is an Australian rally driver. He is the twin brother of the rally and racing driver, Neal Bates. Whilst Neal has achieved more success in the Australian Rally Championship, winning it four times, Rick has won two major cross country events in a nine-year span. The first was Panama-Alaska in 1997 and the next win was the Carrera Sudamericana in 2006.

He has, on at least one occasion, competed directly against his twin brother.

Career
In 1997, Bates won the Panama to Alaska rally driving a Porsche 911 with his co-driver Jenny Brittan. He has also appeared in two events of the World Rally Championship. First, he drove to 30th place at Rally Australia 1997 in a Daihatsu Charade GTi. Then, he drove at China Rally 1999, this time in a Volkswagen Jetta GTX, but he retired on the fifth special stage.

In both occasions, he was co-driven by Jenny Brittan with whom he won the Panama to Alaska rally in 1997. The former event saw him race with his twin brother Neal who scored points with an eighth-place finish.

In 2000, he was third in the London-Sydney Marathon, finishing behind Stig Blomqvist and Michele Mouton.

In 2006, Bates and Brittan also won the Carrera Sudamericana in Argentina.

Results

Complete V8 Supercars Championship results
(key) (Races in bold indicate pole position) (Races in italics indicate fastest lap)

WRC results

Complete Bathurst 1000 results

Complete Sandown endurance results

External links
 WRC Results (eWRC)
 Profile on Driver Database

Australian rally drivers
1965 births
World Rally Championship drivers
Supercars Championship drivers
Living people
Twin sportspeople
Australian Endurance Championship drivers